Cyborg 009 is a Japanese anime series based on the manga of the same name written by Shotaro Ishinomori. The series aired on NET in Japan from April 5, 1968, to September 27, 1968. The opening theme is "Cyborg 009" by Meistersinger while the ending theme is "Tatakai Owatte" by Vocal Shop.

Episode list

References

Cyborg 009 (1968)
Cyborg 009